Bolona is a settlement in the westcentral part of the island of Santo Antão, Cape Verde. In 2010 its population was 112. It is situated about 19 km west of the island capital Porto Novo. At about 1,500 m elevation, it is one of the highest settlements of the island.

See also
List of villages and settlements in Cape Verde

References

Villages and settlements in Santo Antão, Cape Verde
Porto Novo Municipality